Alexandros Varitimiadis (born June 21, 1994) is a Greek professional basketball player for Raiffeisen Dornbirn Lions of the Basketball Zweite Liga. He is a 2.01 m (6 ft 7 in) tall power forward who can also play as a small forward.

Professional career
Varitimiadis began his pro career with the Greek 1st Division club PAOK in 2012. In 2013, he was loaned to Filippos Verias, which was playing in the Greek 2nd Division at the time.

In 2014, he joined the Greek club Aries Trikala. After the appointment of Giannis Kastritis as the head coach, he renewed his contract for one more season.

On August 29, 2017, Varitimiadis left Trikala and joined Udominate of the Swedish Basketligan.

References

External links
Greek League profile
Eurobasket.com profile
RealGM.com profile

1994 births
Living people
Aries Trikala B.C. players
Greek men's basketball players
P.A.O.K. BC players
Power forwards (basketball)
Small forwards
Sportspeople from Giannitsa